Geneviève Gaillard (born 13 May 1947, Niort, Deux-Sèvres), is a French politician, a member of the French Socialist Party, and former Mayor of Niort. Gaillard's initial career was as a veterinarian. She was the Socialist Party Deputy for Deux-Sèvres's 1st constituency from 1997 to 2017.

Biography
Her career as a veterinarian continued until 1989, when she became a City Councillor for Niort.

Gaillard was also vice-president of the French Socialist Party, charged with the environment and social policy. She is noted for her pro-environmental stance, and was part of the "Coppens commission" who prepared the French Charter for the Environment of 2004.

From 2008 to 2014, Gaillard was mayor of Niort.

Selected publications
 
  
 Trade and traffic of dogs and cats, beings, objects from one market to moralize. Information report on the identification of dogs and cats, marketing and supply of COEs, National Assembly, Legislature XI, Commission of the production and trade, the collection documents of the National Assembly, 11–2002. ISSN 1240-831X

References

This article was translated from the equivalent article in the French Wikipedia on 3 July 2009.

1947 births
Living people
People from Niort
French veterinarians
Women veterinarians
Women members of the National Assembly (France)
Deputies of the 13th National Assembly of the French Fifth Republic
Deputies of the 14th National Assembly of the French Fifth Republic
21st-century French women politicians